Saran Nghiem (born 25 December 2003 in Manchester) is an English professional squash player. As of August 2022, she was ranked number 109 in the world. She won the 2021 US Junior Open. She won the 2022 Northern Open.

References

2003 births
Living people
English female squash players